Luisa Tamanini (born 31 January 1980) is a road cyclist from Italy. She represented her nation at the 2005, 2007, 2009 and 2010 UCI Road World Championships.

References

External links
 profile at Procyclingstats.com

1980 births
Italian female cyclists
Living people
Mediterranean Games gold medalists for Italy
Mediterranean Games medalists in cycling
Competitors at the 2009 Mediterranean Games
Sportspeople from Trento
Cyclists from Trentino-Alto Adige/Südtirol